The Emperors Palace South African Masters was a darts tournament organised by the Professional Darts Corporation which began in 2007, so-named because it took place at the Emperors Palace entertainment resort in Johannesburg, South Africa.

Stefan Vermaak is the current champions on 2022 South African Darts Masters he defeats Charles Losper by 9–8 (legs).

Format and qualification
The tournament had 8 players, 4 of which were the top ranked players on the PDC Order of Merit and the semi-finalists, runner up and winner of the PDC South African Open which takes place the day before.
The four players chosen by the PDC were drawn up against the qualifiers from the PDC South African Open in a knock-out tournament.
In 2007, Phil Taylor, Raymond van Barneveld, James Wade and Terry Jenkins, ranked numbers one to four in the Order of Merit respectively at the time, participated in the tournament. In the following year, Taylor and Wade, returned to the tournament, being ranked numbers one and three in the world at the time. John Part, ranked number four in the world, also participated, as did Wayne Mardle, who replaced Barneveld (ranked second) due to the Dutchman's two month sabbatical from darts. Taylor, Wade, Part and Mervyn King took part in the 2009 tournament.

Matches were as follows:

Quarter Final: best of 7 legs
Semi Final: Best of 9 legs (formerly in 2007 best of 11 legs)
Final: Best of 11 legs (formerly in 2007 best of 15 legs, in 2008 best of 9 legs)

Since the 2010 tournament, the event is the direct qualification tournament for the World Darts Championship for South African darts players.

Television
The tournament was broadcast live on SuperSport in South Africa. In the United Kingdom, the tournament was broadcast on Challenge in 2007, Nuts TV in 2008, and Sky Sports in 2009.

Results

2007

2008

2009
 

 During the fifth leg of the semi final between James Wade and Mervyn King, King hit the first ever televised nine-dart finish outside of Europe. He hit two consecutive 180s, and then used T20, T19, D12 to complete the perfect leg. King went 4–1 up as a result of that leg, but still lost the match 5–4.

Previous winners

World Darts Championship Qualification Tournament

References 

2007 establishments in South Africa
Professional Darts Corporation tournaments
International sports competitions hosted by South Africa